Ann Skelly (born 6 December 1996) is an Irish actress. She received IFTA nominations for her performances in the film Kissing Candice (2017) and the miniseries Death and Nightingales (2018). She is also known for her roles in the crime drama Red Rock (2015–2019), the film Rose Plays Julie (2019), and the HBO series The Nevers (2021).

Early life and education
Skelly was born in Dublin and moved to County Wexford as a toddler, first to Ballycanew, then to Oylegate, and later to Kilmuckridge. She went to Coláiste Bríde in Enniscorthy and was homeschooled during her Leaving Cert. She attended the Irish Film Academy's weekend acting classes as a teen. She later trained at Bow Street Academy, graduating in 2017. She is in a relationship with Scottish actor Iain De Caestecker.

Filmography

Film

Television

Awards and nominations

References

External links

Living people
1996 births
21st-century Irish actresses
Actresses from Dublin (city)
Alumni of the Bow Street Academy
Irish film actresses
Irish television actresses
People from County Wexford